White Lightning and Other Favorites is a studio album released by George Jones on May 26, 1959. Its title track "White Lightning" was a #1 Country hit in 1959.

The album is one of the most favorably regarded albums that Jones released in the 1950s. The album charted well, and was one of the most popular country albums of 1959. It also contained some of Jones' first collaborations. "I'm With the Wrong One" was his second collaboration, recorded in 1956 (the oldest song included on the LP) as a duet with Jennette Hicks. "Flame in My Heart" was his third collaboration, recorded as a duet with Virginia Spurlock and released as a single in 1957.

Composition and recording

Side One Tracks
In 1957, Jones signed to Mercury Records and began recording with them in Nashville, leaving the old Starday studio in Houston. White Lightning and Other Favorites was released on May 28, 1959, as a two-sided 33rpm LP. Both sides listed a collaboration and both ended in a Southern-Gospel tune. The oldest song included on the album was recorded at one of his last recording sessions with Starday Records in August 1956 titled: "I'm With the Wrong One," written by Jones. 
White Lightning
"White Lightning" was released in February 1959, and became a #1 hit written by a close-friend of Jones', who wrote a Top 10 for Jones the previous year. The Big Bopper wrote the song and included on his only LP release. Jones asked his manager, H.W. "Pappy" Daily, if he could record it, and requested that he give it to nobody else. Jones recorded the song in September 1958 at the Bradley Film and Recording Studio in Nashville. It was released as a single three days after Richardson (The Bopper) died in a plane crash.

"That's the Way I Feel" was recorded in September 1957 and was written by Jones, like most of the tracks on the album. Jones would write or co-write 10 of the songs and all of Side 2. "Life to Go" was one of Jones best compositions, written after Jones played the Old Time Fiddlers Convention in Crockett, Texas, with Jackson and Ernest Tubb.  There was a prison there and, while walking around the grounds with Jackson, they began chatting with an inmate.  At one point  they asked him how much time he had left to serve, to which the prisoner replied, "I been here for eighteen years and still got life to go."  "His remark chilled me to the bone," Jones wrote in his 1996 autobiography I Lived To Tell It All.  "I had hated the prison, but I knew I'd be leaving.  That man hated it more and knew he'd never leave.  I wanted to get that prison out of my mind.  But I couldn't." "Don't Do This To Me" was recorded on March 19, 1957, and written by Jones. "Wandering Soul" was recorded in September 1957 and was written by Bill Dudley and Jones.

Side Two Tracks
"Giveaway Girl" was written by Jones and Sid Kessel on March 19, 1957. "You're Back Again" was recorded and Jones and Hank Locklin, Locklin singing the backing-vocals for the track during an October 1956 session. "No Use to Cry" was recorded on April 23, 1957, and written by Jones. It was also included on his 1958 studio release: "Long Live King George." "Nothing Can Stop Me" was released as the b-side to I'm With Wrong One in July 1958. It was written by Roger Miller and Jones and recorded on June 5, 1957. "Flame in My Heart" was recorded with fellow Mercury artists Virginia Spurlock on March 19, 1957. It was Jones third collaboration during his 50+ year career. "Jesus Wants Me" was the last song of the album and was a southern gospel song written by Jones with Eddie Noack, and was recorded on April 21, 1958.

In his autobiography, Jones apologized to readers who might be disappointed that he had not provided more information in his book about his recording sessions because "I've worked so many of them too drunk to walk but not too drunk to sing.  I can't remember much about them."  As he later explained to Billboard in 2006, "I would say 90% of the time I would be in pretty damn good shape when I went into the studio. I did have a little sense, not a whole lot. But I would still have to have a little build-up of courage, three or four drinks throughout the session time. I don't know, it seemed to mellow you out and relax you a little more, and you would even feel your songs better."

Track listing

Reception

White Lightning would go on to brcomr one of Jones' biggest #1 hits. He would often perform it live throughout his career (as it was a big fan hit) and re-recorded it multiple times. The album it produced was arguably the best of Jones' LP releases during his early career.

External links
George Jones' Official Website
Record Label

1959 albums
George Jones albums
Albums produced by Pappy Daily
Mercury Records albums